Westmount is an affluent municipality on the Island of Montreal, in southwestern Quebec, Canada. It is an enclave of the city of Montreal, with a population of 19,658 as of the 2021 Canadian census.

Westmount is home to schools, an arena, a pool, a public library and a number of parks, including Westmount Park, King George Park (also known as Murray Hill Park) and Westmount Summit. The city operates its own electricity distribution company Westmount Light & Power (Hydro-Westmount). The city is also the location of two Canadian Forces Primary Reserve units: The Royal Montreal Regiment and 34th Signals Regiment.

Traditionally, the community of Westmount has been a wealthy and predominantly anglophone enclave, having been at one point the richest community in Canada. It is now the most affluent neighbourhood in Canada outside of Toronto and Vancouver.

History
There are clues of a First Nations presence 4000 to 5000 years ago. A large amount of prehistoric burial sites were found within the area of Westmount.

When the first French colonists settled in the area in the middle of the seventeenth century, this area was known by several names including La Petite Montagne, Notre-Dame-de-Grâce and Côte-Saint-Antoine. A former farmhouse from this era, Hurtubise House, is the oldest house still standing in Westmount.

The Village of Côte St-Antoine was first incorporated in 1874. It later became the Town of Côte St-Antoine.

It was renamed Westmount, in 1895, reflecting the geographical location of the city on the southwest slope of Mount Royal and the presence of a large English-speaking population.

During the twentieth century, Westmount became a wealthy Montreal suburb; a small city dotted with many green spaces. Architect Robert Findlay, a resident in the early twentieth century, designed many municipal buildings in the city, including the library, Westmount City Hall and several other buildings of public order.

In the twentieth century, Westmount was home to some of Montreal's wealthiest families including the Bronfmans and the Molsons. This made the city a symbolic target of Front de libération du Québec terrorist bombings in the 1960s, culminating in the 1970 October Crisis.

Following the death of former Quebec Premier René Lévesque in 1987, the city of Montreal renamed Dorchester Boulevard René Lévesque Boulevard. After the city of Montreal changed the name, Westmount retained the name of Dorchester on their portion, as did Montréal-Est.

Merger with Montreal
In 2001, while trying to prevent Westmount from being amalgamated into the city of Montreal, Westmount Mayor Peter Trent and city council asserted that the city was a designated anglophone institution and should not be merged into francophone greater Montreal. In response to this opposition, Municipal Affairs Minister Louise Harel said that Westmount's resistance "reeked of colonialism" and that the opposition was an "ethnic project", statements for which she would refuse to apologize.  When asked for comment, Quebec Premier Bernard Landry said the minister had his full support and that the opposition was little more than Quebec bashing. Several federalist public figures criticized Landry's statement: Jean Charest called it insulting to the intelligence of the citizens of Quebec; Joseph Gabary, president of the Quebec Chapter of the Canadian Jewish Congress, called the language "crude"; Alliance Quebec also criticized the premier for singling out the city for special criticism.

On January 1, 2002, as part of the 2002–2006 municipal reorganization of Montreal, Westmount was merged into the city of Montreal and became a borough. However, after a change of government and a 2004 referendum, it was re-constituted as an independent city on January 1, 2006. It is now one of fifteen independent suburbs on the Island of Montreal, and the only one that directly borders the downtown core.

Nevertheless, it remains part of the urban agglomeration of Montreal and the bulk of its municipal taxes go to the Agglomeration Council, which oversees activities common to all municipalities on the Island of Montreal (e.g. police, fire protection, public transit) even after the demerger.

Geography
The city, most of which is on steep terrain, extends from the summit to the end of the narrow plateau at the foot of the mountain.

Cityscape

Most of the city is residential. Homes increase in size and value toward the top of the mountain, with the largest and most expensive being on or near Summit Circle.

Notable buildings include Place Alexis Nihon and the Westmount Square complex, which was designed by Ludwig Mies van der Rohe and funded largely by Westmount resident Samuel Bronfman, the founder of the Seagram liquor empire.

There are several small commercial districts on Sherbrooke Street from the city's western boundary to the intersection of Sherbrooke Street and Victoria Avenue ("Victoria Village"), on Saint Catherine Street across from Place Alexis Nihon, on Greene Avenue and on De Maisonneuve Boulevard near the Atwater metro station.

Parks
There are several parks within the city, including King George Park (also known as Murray Hill) and Westmount Park. A forest area is located at Westmount Summit, within Summit Circle.

Westmount Park
Located between Sherbrooke Street and De Maisonneuve Boulevard to the north and south, and Melville and Lansdowne Avenue to the east and west, this  park is the second largest in Westmount.

The landscaping design was undertaken in 1912 by M.J. Manning, and comprises large playing fields at the east and south sides, and Westmount Arena and adjacent swimming pool at the southwest corner. The central area contains an extensive playground, footpaths, ponds and wading pools, and tennis courts. Westmount Public Library, built in 1897, Victoria Hall, and a large greenhouse are located on the north side.

Demographics 

StatsCan lists the median after-tax income in 2015 as $41,674. The three largest occupation categories were management, business, and "education, law and social, community and government services"; each of these sectors employed about 20% of Westmount workers.

Government

Municipal
Since regaining its status as a city, Westmount is governed by a City Council made up of a mayor and eight "district" councillors. The current mayor of Westmount is Christina Smith, who was elected interim mayor at a special council meeting on April 24, 2017, following the retirement of long-serving Mayor Peter Trent. Smith later went on to win an election November 5, 2017 to remain mayor.
She retained her position in 2021, being acclaimed. In addition to the local city council, Westmount is represented by its mayor on the Montreal Agglomeration Council.

Former mayors
List of former mayors:

 Eustache Prud'homme (1874–1875)
 James Kewley Ward (1875–1884)
 Alexander Cowper Hutchison (1884–1887)
 Thomas Patton (1887–1890)
 John MacFarlane (1890–1891)
 Matthew Hutchinson (1891–1894)
 James Henry Redfern (1894–1896)
 Frederick William Evans (1896–1898)
 James Robert Walker (1898–1900)
 William Douw Lighthall (1900–1903)
 Alexander S. George Cross (1903–1905)
 Charles-Albert Duclos (1905–1906)
 James W. Knox (1906–1907)
 William Galbraith (1907–1909)
 William Henry Trenholme (1909–1911)
 William Rutherford (1911–1913)
 John MacKergow (1913–1919)
 Peter William MacLagan (1919–1927)
 George Hogg (1927–1933)
 John Jenkins (1933–1939)
 Walter Alfred Merrill (1939–1945)
 R. Percy Adams (1945–1949)
 James S. Cameron (1949–1953)
 Roy L. Campbell (1953–1955)
 James Arthur de Lalanne (1955–1957)
 Aimé Sydney Bruneau (1957–1959)
 J. C. Cushing (1959–1963)
 Chipman Hazen Drury (1963–1965)
 M. L. Tucker (1965–1968)
 Peter Michael MacEntyre (1968–1971)
 Paul A. Ouimet (1971–1975)
 Donald Charles MacCallum (1975–1983)
 Brian O'Neil Gallery (1983–1987)
 May Ebbitt (Cutler) (1987–1991)
 Peter Francis Trent (1991–2002, 2009–2017)
 Karin Marks (2006–2009)
 Christina M. Smith (2017–present)

Provincial and Federal
Throughout Quebec, Westmount is known as an overwhelmingly Liberal riding, both federally and provincially.

On the federal level, Westmount is represented in the Notre-Dame-de-Grâce—Westmount riding. The riding was won by Marc Garneau in the 2015 federal election.

Provincially, the city is represented in the riding of Westmount–Saint-Louis by MNA Jennifer Maccarone of the Quebec Liberal Party.

Sports
Westmount was home of the Montreal Arena, the third arena in history to be built specifically for hockey.  It was the home rink for the Montreal Wanderers, one of the great teams of the early hockey era, as well as the legendary Montreal Canadiens.  The arena burned down in 1918, causing the Wanderers to disband.

In 2010, Mayor Peter Trent unveiled a $38-million project to demolish the old arena and create two new rinks, a larger swimming pool, refurbished tennis courts, and an extra acre of green space. In the fall of 2013, the new Westmount Recreation Centre opened. It is home to the Westmount Wings, Lasalle/Westmount Cobras and was the home of the Westmount Predators that are no longer active.

Westmount is home to the Westmount Lynx Lacrosse Club, which has field lacrosse teams for boys and girls aged 8–16.

Westmount is also home of the oldest active rugby club in North America, the Westmount Rugby Club.

In addition, the city's swim team, the Westmount Dolphins,  won the 2007 Section B Alps finals.

Tennis star Eugenie Bouchard grew up in Westmount.

Education

The city is home to two CEGEPs: the public anglophone Dawson College and the private anglophone Marianopolis College.

The Commission scolaire de Montréal (CSDM) operates French-language schools in Westmount.

English-language public schools in Westmount are operated by the English Montreal School Board (EMSB). These include Westmount High School, its sister elementary school Westmount Park School and Roslyn Elementary School, which is significant for introducing the first French Immersion Program on the Island of Montreal in 1968.

Westmount is also home to several private schools, including coeducational St. George's School of Montreal as well as Miss Edgar's and Miss Cramp's School, The Study and the French-language Villa Sainte-Marcelline for girls and Selwyn House School for boys.

The Montreal Hoshuko School, a supplementary Japanese school serving Japanese nationals and Japanese Canadians in the Montreal area, previously held classes at the Westmount Park School in Westmount.

International relations

Twin towns — Sister cities
Westmount is twinned with:
 Rimouski, Quebec, Canada (since 1968)

Notable people 

Musicians Leonard Cohen and Sam Roberts were born in Westmount, as was the actress and comedian Caroline Rhea. The city is currently home to many notable Montrealers, including the federal MP and former astronaut Marc Garneau.

United States Vice President Kamala Harris lived for part of her youth in the area, and attended Westmount High School.

Fiction 
Westmount has been the setting for a number of novels. Gwethalyn Graham's World War II novel Earth and High Heaven told the story of a romance between a wealthy English girl from Westmount and a Jewish lawyer from Northern Ontario. David Montrose' 1950s hard-boiled detective novel, The Crime on Cote des Neiges, was translated into French as Meurtre à Westmount. Daniel Richler's Kicking Tomorrow is a bildungsroman of a teenager growing up in a Westmount family in the 1970s, mentioning how the students at Westmount High School were "famous in the City for the achievement of being perpetually stoned." Claire Rothman's novel Lear's Shadow takes place amidst an outdoor summer production of the Shakespeare play in Westmount Park. Edward Openshaw Phillips wrote a series of mystery novels starring an anglophone Westmount lawyer, most of which were set in Westmount.

See also
 List of former boroughs
 Montreal Merger
 Municipal reorganization in Quebec
 The Westmount Examiner, a now-defunct newspaper

References

External links

 Walking tour of Westmount

 
Cities and towns in Quebec
Mount Royal
Bilingual cities and towns in Quebec
Island of Montreal municipalities